D. Newlin Fell School is a public elementary school located in the East Oregon neighborhood of South Philadelphia. It is part of the School District of Philadelphia, and shares a site with the George C. Thomas Junior High School. It was named in honor of D. Newlin Fell, who served as a Justice of the Pennsylvania Supreme Court from 1894 to  1910 and Chief Justice until 1915.

The historic building was designed by Irwin T. Catharine and built in 1922–1924. It is a three-story, eight bay, brick building on a raised basement in the Colonial Revival-style. It features two projecting entrances with stone surrounds and a brick parapet.

It was added to the National Register of Historic Places in 1988.

Students zoned to Fell are zoned to South Philadelphia High School.

References

External links
 Fell School
 

School buildings on the National Register of Historic Places in Philadelphia
Colonial Revival architecture in Pennsylvania
School buildings completed in 1924
South Philadelphia
Public K–8 schools in Philadelphia
School District of Philadelphia
1924 establishments in Pennsylvania